L. Ayyalusamy is an Indian politician and former Member of the Legislative Assembly of Tamil Nadu. He was elected to the Tamil Nadu legislative assembly as a Communist Party of India candidate from Kovilpatti constituency in 1996 election.

References 

Communist Party of India politicians from Tamil Nadu
Living people
Tamil Nadu MLAs 1996–2001
Year of birth missing (living people)